Sheikh Ali al-Bakka Mosque or Shaykh Ali al-Baka Mosque is a 13th-century mosque in the northwestern section of the Old City of Hebron in the southern West Bank. It is situated in the Harat ash-Sheikh (or Sheik Ali al-Bakka) quarter, one of the Old City's quarters, which is named after the mosque.

The mosque was founded by the Husam ad-Din Turuntay in 1282 during the reign of Mamluk sultan al-Mansur Qalawun. Turuntay was the representative of the sultan in Jerusalem. The sanctuary is named after Sheikh Ali al-Bakka, a renowned Sufi religious leader from Iraq who lived in Hebron. The minaret was erected by the viceroy and practical strongman of the sultanate, Sayf al-Din Salar (d. 1310).

The original mosque was mostly demolished, however the minaret still stands and is viewed as an exemplary work of Mamluk architecture. Sitting on a rectangular base, its shaft has a hexagonal shape. The minaret base has an arched corridor which leads to the courtyard. In 1978 a new mosque was built on the site, but preserved the remains of the original mosque.

References

Further reading

 (p. 242)
 (pp. 220, 222, 224, 227, 291 ff)

 (Sharon, 2013, p. 58 ff)
 

13th-century mosques
Mosques in Hebron
Mamluk architecture in the State of Palestine
Mosques completed in 1282